Anaespogonius is a genus of longhorn beetles of the subfamily Lamiinae, containing the following species:

 Anaespogonius fulvus Gressitt, 1938
 Anaespogonius piceonigris Hayashi, 1972

References

Desmiphorini
Cerambycidae genera